European Lacrosse Federation (ELF) is the sport governing body of men and women's lacrosse in Europe. It was founded in 1995 by the Czech Republic, Scotland, England, Sweden, Germany, and Wales. There are currently 34 member nations.

Overview
The ELF sponsors the European Lacrosse Championships for national teams in both men’s and women's lacrosse. The annual Aleš Hřebeský Memorial tournament in Prague is the largest European box lacrosse tournament. The main club field lacrosse competition is the Ken Galluccio Cup, where the winner of each country’s league competes to decide the European club champion.

The ELF is an affiliate member of the lacrosse world governing body, World Lacrosse. 21 ELF members are full members of the WL, which is the majority of all full members.

In March 2022, due to the 2022 Russian invasion of Ukraine, Russian teams, athletes, and officials were suspended from participation in World Lacrosse events and qualifiers, and it was decided that no World Lacrosse or European Lacrosse Federation events would be held in Russia.

Members

References

External links
Official website

International lacrosse